Félix Assunção Antunes (14 December 1922 – 6 July 1998), known as Félix, was a Portuguese footballer who used to play as midfielder or as defender. He is notable for his run with S.L. Benfica.

Career
While he played football he was at the same time a CUF Indústrial Worker.

Félix used to have a great positional presence and he was the engine of the team, it was common among the supporters the expression "SL & FÉLIX". He played ten seasons with the Benfica jersey from 1944 to 1954. He was considered as one of the best defenders in the world back in the days.

He started his career as a centre-back by the hand of János Biri (1946). With the arrival of Lippo Hertzka (1947), Félix started being used as midfielder, but when Ted Smith arrived he changed the all tactical perspective of the team, putting Félix at centre-back, the position he became famous at.

He was part of the team that won the Latin Cup against FC Bordeaux (1950).

He ended his career at 30 years old due to an episode that occurred after a Benfica loss against Vitória S.C., when after the game Félix threw his shirt to the floor on the locker room. Due to this disrespectful act against the SL Benfica symbol, the president of Benfica dismissed his services.

National team
Félix represented the Portugal national football team 15 times.

Honours and awards
Portuguese Liga: (1) 1949/50
Portuguese Cup: (4)1948/49, 1950/51, 1951/52 and 1952/53
Latin Cup: (1) 1949/50

External links

1922 births
Sportspeople from Barreiro, Portugal
1998 deaths
Portuguese footballers
S.L. Benfica footballers
Portugal international footballers
Association football midfielders
Association football defenders